A plebiscite on the legality of alcoholic beverages was held in Ontario, Canada on January 1, 1894. Per the terms of the Prohibition Plebiscite Act passed in 1893, a plebiscite was held on the issue in conjunction with the 1894 municipal elections. Though a majority of voters indicated support for prohibition, the results were non-binding and prohibition would not occur in Ontario until 1916.

Plebiscite question 
Are you in favour of the immediate prohibition by law of the importation, manufacture and sale of intoxicating liquors as a beverage?

Results 

Unmarried women and widows were permitted to vote in the plebiscite, though they voted in a ballot of a different colour (blue for women, yellow for men). Though the plebiscite passed, the results were non-binding and prohibition would not occur in Ontario until 1916. Provincial prohibition, though having majority support, would face another roadblock in 1896 when the Judicial Committee of the Privy Council determined that provinces do not have the authority to prohibit the importation of alcohol.

See also 
 Prohibition in Canada
 Canada Temperance Act
 1902 Ontario prohibition referendum
 1919 Ontario prohibition referendum
 1921 Ontario prohibition referendum
 1924 Ontario prohibition referendum

References

Bibliography

1894 in Ontario
1894 referendums
Ontario prohibition referendums
1894 elections in Canada
January 1894 events